All That Matters may refer to:

Music
All That Matters (Portrait album), 1995
All That Matters (Michael Bolton album), 1997
"All That Matters" (ABC song), 1991
"All That Matters" (Cliff Richard song), 1997
"All That Matters" (Louise song), 1998
All That Matters, a song on Mark Knopfler's album Shangri-La (2004), also appearing on his live collaboration with Emmylou Harris, Real Live Roadrunning (2006)
"All That Matters (The Beautiful Life)", a 2012 song by Kesha
"All That Matters" (Justin Bieber song), 2013
"All That Matters" (Estelle song), 2015

Other uses
All That Matters, a series of books published by Teach Yourself
All That Matters (play), a 1911 British play by Charles McEvoy
All That Matters Is Past, in Norwegian Uskyld, 2012 Norwegian drama film directed by Sara Johnsen
All That Matters (novel), a 2004 novel by Wayson Choy